Ap is the Vedic Sanskrit term for "water", which in Classical Sanskrit only occurs in the plural  (sometimes re-analysed as a thematic singular), whence Hindi . The term is from PIE  "water".
The Indo-Iranian word also survives as the Persian word for water, āb,  e.g. in Punjab (from panj-āb "five waters"). In archaic ablauting contractions, the laryngeal of the PIE root remains visible in Vedic Sanskrit, e.g.  "against the current", from *. In Tamil, Appu (Tamil form of "Ap") means water, and has references in poetry.

In the Rigveda, several hymns are dedicated to "the waters": 7.49, 10.9, 10.30, 10.137. In the oldest of these, 7.49, the waters are connected with the drought of Indra.  Agni, the god of fire, has a close association with water and is often referred to as Apām Napāt "offspring of the waters". In Vedic astrology, the female deity Apah is the presiding deity of the Purva Ashadha asterism, meaning "first of the aṣāḍhā", with aṣāḍhā "the invincible one" being the name of the  greater constellation.

In Hindu philosophy, the term refers to  water as an element, one of the Panchamahabhuta, or "five great elements". In Hinduism, it is also the name of the deva Varuna a personification of water, one of the Vasus in most later Puranic lists.

Notes

See also 
 Varuna, the god of water
 Samudra, the sea god
 Abzu, the Sumerian primeval waters
 Aban or āpō, the Avestan concept of "the waters"
 Doab, spit of land lying between two confluent rivers
 Old European hydronymy
 Rigvedic rivers
 Sea and river deity

Classical elements
Hindu deities
Hindu philosophical concepts
Rigveda
Sanskrit words and phrases
Water and religion
Rigvedic deities